Vito Joseph Lopez (June 5, 1941 – November 9, 2015) was an American politician from New York. He was a member of the New York State Assembly, and chairman of the Democratic Party of Kings County.

Personal life
Vito Lopez was born on June 5, 1941, in Bensonhurst, Brooklyn, of an Italian American family; his last name Lopez derives from his grandfather, who was a native of Spain. He graduated from Brooklyn's James Madison High School, and received a BS in Business Administration from Long Island University (1964), and a Master of Social Work from Yeshiva University (1970), where he was trained in the community organizing program. Lopez had two children by his former wife, Joan.

Lopez was diagnosed with leukemia in 1993, and in 2010 was treated for a recurrence of cancer.  He died on November 9, 2015, at Sloan Kettering Memorial Hospital at the age of 74.

Early career
Lopez began his career with the New York City Department of Social Services, at the Stanhope Street Senior Center in Bushwick, Brooklyn. Believing the neighborhood received little attention from City Hall and senior citizen programs there received even less in terms of program support, Lopez began organizing senior citizens there. His first attracted citywide attention by organizing in November 1981 an assembly of 100 senior citizens at Brooklyn Borough Hall to protest what they saw as the "serious neglect" shown to them in programs for decent housing, nursing homes and medical facilities.

Lopez began researching the programs for senior citizens available from local, state and federal funding sources in order to supplement the relatively meager services offered at the Stanhope Street Senior Center. This led his to conceive the idea of creating a not-for-profit that would enter into government contracts to provide services for senior citizens, which he planned would focus on Bushwick and the neighboring Italian-American community of Ridgewood, located in the borough of Queens.

In 1973, he founded Ridgewood Bushwick Senior Citizens Council (RBSCC), a non-profit organization to provide services to senior citizens in Bushwick and the adjoining (interborough) neighborhood of Ridgewood, Queens as well as surrounding areas. The first contract it won was to manage the Stanhope Street Senior Center. The Council aggressively pursued government funds and promoted itself as the primary contact for citizens looking for government assistance, even assistance not within the purview of the Council's contracts.

Over time as the Council increased in size and importance, Lopez used it to generate loyalty among constituents for which it provided services and to employ locals to create an administrative staff. These two groups allowed Lopez to gain his political positions beginning with his Assembly seat in 1984. While he resigned as Executive Director of the Council on winning the seat, he remained closely associated with it and used his political clout on its behalf. At the height of his political influence the Council "served as a de facto political machine for him and his allies ..."

According to the Daily News, by 2010 as Assemblyman Lopez had steered $430,000 in state grants to the Ridgewood-Bushwick Citizens Council. At that time, the Council had $100 million in state and city contracts to build affordable homes, provide meals to seniors and run after-school programs. The Daily News found that for the period 2007-2010 firms doing businesses with the Council (and their subcontractors) contributed $51,000 to election campaigns of Lopez or to the Kings County Democratic Committee of which Lopez was chairman.

Political career
Lopez was a member of the New York State Assembly (53rd D.) from 1985 to 2013, sitting in the 186th, 187th, 188th, 189th, 190th, 191st, 192nd, 193rd, 194th, 195th, 196th, 197th, 198th, 199th and 200th New York State Legislatures. His district comprised the Brooklyn neighborhoods of Bushwick and Williamsburg.

From 2006-12, Lopez served as the chairman of the Kings County Democratic Party, having replaced former chairman Clarence Norman Jr. On August 28, 2012, Lopez announced that he would not seek re-election as Brooklyn Democratic leader due to allegations that he sexual harassed two of his staffers. Lopez was forced to step down after it was revealed that he settled a lawsuit by two of his female staffers who alleged that he had sexually harassed them. On May 17, 2013, Lopez also resigned from then his assembly seat effective at the end of the legislative session June 20, 2013. Several days later Lopez moved up his resignation date to May 20, 2013.

Political stances
Lopez was among the sponsors of a bill to expand the original 1982 Loft Law, "...which gave rights to illegal tenants and made their lofts subject to rent stabilization." The 2009 Loft Law Amendment, which went into effect June 2010, expanded these protections to lofts in manufacturing areas of Bushwick, Williamsburg, Greenpoint, and Long Island City.

While Lopez previously sponsored similar legislation, he did not support a 2009 bill, the Child Victims Act, sponsored by Assemblywoman Margaret Markey. This bill would have opened a one-year window to allow older victims of prior childhood sexual abuse the ability to file civil actions against their abusers.

He has sponsored a competing bill that provides no window, but would change current law to allow lawsuits against public institutions without requiring a 90-day notice of claim. The New York Times reported on June 9, 2009, that in an effort to reach a compromise with Lopez's bill, Markey amended her bill to specifically include all public institutions through the waiver of the current 90-day notice of claim requirement, and also limited the window to victims aged 53 or younger.

During an October 13, 2006, meeting with the Lambda Independent Democrats, a political club of gay Democrats in New York City, Lopez publicly declared his support for extending the right of civil marriage to same-sex couples for the first time in his political career. He also intimated that he would help to enact legislation that would recognize same-sex marriages, which the highest court in New York State had refused to recognize earlier that year.

Pork Barrel Politics
In 2018 Dan Doctoroff said that Lopez refused to support the Bloomberg administrator's rezoning of the Brooklyn waterfront unless the administration allocated a million dollars for a daycare center that Doctoroff thought Lopez's girlfriend was connected to. By Doctoroff's account, this happened the day before the city council vote; time was limited, and after midnight Doctoroff called the head of the agency that oversaw daycare centers, woke him up, and secured the million dollars for the center to meet Lopez's demand and pass the rezoning.

Investigations
According to multiple media account in September 2010, Lopez and the  Ridgewood Bushwick Senior Citizens Council were the subject of several investigations, led by the US Attorney in Manhattan and in Brooklyn, and the New York City Department of Investigations.

Censure
On August 24, 2012, the New York State Assembly Standing Committee on Ethics and Guidance concluded an investigation, made in response to allegations brought forth by two young female staffers, and unanimously found that Vito Lopez had violated the Assembly’s sexual harassment/retaliation policy.

Based on recommendations from the committee, Assembly Speaker Sheldon Silver removed him as chair of the Committee on Housing, stripped him of all seniority, reduced his staff allotment and forbade him from employing any interns or persons under the age of 21. Silver also censured and admonished him on behalf of the Assembly. He was reelected in November 2012 despite token opposition, but was stripped of his Democratic chairmanship and had his pay cut.

In mid-May 2013 the state’s Joint Commission on Public Ethics issued a report which described in detail the behavior alleged by multiple women, which prompted prominent Democrats, including Governor Andrew Cuomo and Speaker Silver, to call for his immediate resignation. In response Lopez, citing a report by special prosecutor Staten Island District Attorney Daniel M. Donovan Jr. that he would not bring criminal charges. On May 17, 2013, he announced he would resign from the Assembly at the end of his term in June 2013 and in the fall run for a seat on the New York City Council.

This announcement brought further calls from his immediate resignation, including by Assembly Minority leader Brian M. Kolb, and brought a vow by City Council Speaker Christine C. Quinn, a Democrat running for Mayor, that she would work to prevent his election. That afternoon Speaker Silver released a draft resolution to expel Lopez from the Assembly that he said would be voted on when the Assembly returns on May 20, 2013.

Resignation
Lopez resigned in May 2013 after a legislative ethics panel censured him. On June 11, 2013, Lopez was fined $330,000 who was accused of groping, intimidating and manipulating young female staffers in a 2012 scandal.

2013 New York City Council election
Lopez ran in the 2013 New York City Council elections to succeed Diana Reyna in the 34th district. He lost the Democratic primary to Antonio Reynoso.  Lopez won 37% of the vote and Reynoso 49%.

References

External links
 'Vito's Brooklyn Comeback Party', The Politicker, The New York Observer
 'Bill Aims to Spur Housing for New York’s Poor', The New York Times
 'Clarence Norman Successor Faces Questions', The New York Sun
 'Brooklyn Democrat Vito Lopez emerges Assembly's top hog in handing out pork dollars' The New York Daily News
 'Pfizer Offering Williamsburg Plant Site for Affordable Housing-So, Why's a State Assemblyman Trying to Seize It?' The New York Observer
 'Democrats in Brooklyn: Vito Lopez Continues the Corruption' The Daily Gotham citing The New York Times, The New York Post, The New York Daily News, etc.
 Julian E. Barnes,"The Two Faces of Bushwick; A Troubled Brooklyn Neighborhood Is Mending. But Its Leaders Are Feuding Over the Size of the Gains and What to Do Next" NY Times Online, The New York Times, February 27, 2000
 David Freedlander, The Lion in Winter: Vito Lopez And The End Of County, City Hall, March 1, 2010
 Marwell, Nicole P., Bargaining for Brooklyn: community organizations in the entrepreneurial city, University of Chicago Press, 2007

2015 deaths
1941 births
Democratic Party members of the New York State Assembly
American people of Italian descent
American people of Spanish descent
Long Island University alumni
Yeshiva University alumni
Politicians from Brooklyn
21st-century American politicians
New York (state) politicians convicted of crimes
James Madison High School (Brooklyn) alumni
People from Bensonhurst, Brooklyn